William Bitten (born July 10, 1998) is a Canadian professional ice hockey forward currently playing with the Springfield Thunderbirds in the American Hockey League (AHL) as a prospect under contract to the St. Louis Blues in the National Hockey League (NHL). He was selected by the Montreal Canadiens in the third-round, 70th overall, of the 2016 NHL Entry Draft.

Playing career 
Bitten played major junior hockey with the Plymouth Whalers, Flint Firebirds, and the Hamilton Bulldogs in the Ontario Hockey League (OHL) from 2014–2018. During his tenure in the OHL, he was selected in the third-round, 70th overall, of the 2016 NHL Entry Draft by the Montreal Canadiens.  

During his final junior season with the Bulldogs, Bitten was signed to a three-year, entry-level contract with the Montreal Canadiens on March 7, 2018. 

After attending training camp with Montreal in approach to his first professional season, Bitten was traded by the Canadiens to the Minnesota Wild in exchange for Gustav Olofsson on October 3, 2018. He was assigned to begin the 2018–19 season with the Wild's AHL affiliate, the Iowa Wild. 

Remaining in the AHL for the duration of his entry-level contract, Bitten was re-signed by the Wild to a one-year, two-way contract extension on August 9, 2021. Continuing in his fourth season within the Wild organization in 2021–22, Bitten collected 3 goals and 8 points through 23 games before he was traded by the Wild to the St. Louis Blues in exchange for Nolan Stevens on December 29, 2021. Bitten immediately responded to the change of scenery, increasing his offensive totals in posting 10 goals and 25 points through 45 regular season games. In the post-season, Bitten led the Thunderbirds in scoring in propelling the club to the Calder Cup finals, collecting 8 goals and 21 points in just 18 games. 

As a restricted free agent, Bitten was re-signed by the Blues to a two-year, two-way contract extension on July 13, 2022. He was returned to the Thunderbirds to begin the  season, before he received his first recall to the Blues on December 3, 2022. He made his NHL debut with the Blues that night, skating on the fourth-line, in a 6-2 defeat to the Pittsburgh Penguins. He registered his first point, an assist, in his next appearance, helping  the Blues to a 7-4 victory over the New York Islanders on December 6, 2022.

Career statistics

Regular season and playoffs

International

Awards and honours

References

External links
 

1998 births
Living people
Flint Firebirds players
Hamilton Bulldogs (OHL) players
Iowa Wild players
Montreal Canadiens draft picks
Plymouth Whalers players
St. Louis Blues players
Springfield Thunderbirds players